Mark Adams (born June 26, 1956) is a college basketball analyst on the ESPN family of networks. Adams was previously head coach of the Central Connecticut Blue Devils from 1991 to 1996.

Adams was also an assistant coach at Washington State University from 1989-91, head coach at Western Oregon University from 1985-89, head coach Rocky Mountain College from 1982-85, and assistant coach at Idaho State University from 1979-82.

References

1956 births
Living people
Central Connecticut Blue Devils men's basketball coaches
College men's basketball head coaches in the United States
Idaho State Bengals men's basketball coaches
Washington State Cougars men's basketball coaches
Western Oregon Wolves men's basketball coaches